The KN-3 reactor (VM-16) is the nuclear reactor used in pairs to power the s. The reactor was also intended to be used on the Ulyanovsk class of supercarriers. It is a pressurized water reactor (PWR), using enriched uranium-235 fuel to produce 300 MW of power.

It was developed by OKBM Afrikantov.

Soviet naval reactors
Pressurized water reactors

de:Kirow-Klasse#Antrieb